Robert Wauchope may refer to:
Robert Wauchope (archaeologist) (1909–1979), American archaeologist
Robert Wauchope (bishop) (fl. 1539–1551), Archbishop of Armagh
Robert Wauchope (Royal Navy officer) (1788–1862), Royal Navy Admiral and inventor of the time ball

See also
Robert Wauch (1786–1866), Royal Navy Captain and namesake of Wauchope, New South Wales
Wauchope (disambiguation)